Tia Sáng ('The Spark') was a Trotskyist Vietnamese-language newspaper. Tia Sang was the legal organ of the October group. Tia Sang was founded in 1938. It superseded the underground newspaper Tháng Mười ('October'). It was initially a weekly, but was later converted into a daily newspaper in the beginning of the year.

References

Newspapers published in Vietnam
Vietnamese-language newspapers
Newspapers established in 1938
Communist newspapers
1938 establishments in the French colonial empire